The Days of Abandonment (} is a film of 2005 by Roberto Faenza, set in Turin, based on the novel The Days of Abandonment by Elena Ferrante.

Synopsis
Olga (Buy), literary translator, wife and mother of two is suddenly abandoned by her husband (Zingaretti) for a younger woman. With this she enters into a painful lapse that turns into despair that brings her to sleep and food deprivation. She encounters a neighbour musician (Goran Bregović) that moves something in her. After a descent into hell and eventual rise from despair, Olga lives an insight that makes her realize that she was not losing her mind for the lost love but discovers the meaning of losing her dignity and being imprisoned in a single role, which she must break in order to enjoy life.

Cast
Margherita Buy: Olga
Luca Zingaretti: Mario 
Goran Bregovic: Damian
Alessia Goria: Mendicante
Gea Lionello: Lea
Gaia Bermani Amaral: Carla
Sara Santostasi: Ilaria  
Simone Della Croce: Gianni

Awards
The film has received five nominations for several awards:
David di Donatello 2006 (Best music and best original composer)
Sindacato Nazionale Giornalisti Cinematografici Italiani 2006 (Best Actor in a Main role and Best Actress in a main role)
Venice Film Festival 2005 (Best directing)

External links
 Official site
 

Italian drama films
2005 films
Films directed by Roberto Faenza
Films scored by Goran Bregović
2000s Italian films
Films based on works by Elena Ferrante